The first season of the American science-fiction television series Star Trek, originally created by Gene Roddenberry, premiered on NBC on September 8, 1966, and concluded on April 13, 1967. The season debuted in Canada on CTV two days before the US premiere, on September 6, 1966. It consisted of 29 episodes, which is the highest number of episodes in a season for the original series of Star Trek. It features William Shatner as Captain James T. Kirk, Leonard Nimoy as Spock, and DeForest Kelley as Leonard McCoy.

Broadcast history
The season originally aired on Thursdays at 8:30pm (ET) on NBC.

Cast

 William Shatner as Captain James T. Kirk: Commanding officer of the USS Enterprise
 Leonard Nimoy as Commander Spock: The ship's half-human/half-Vulcan science officer and first/executive officer (i.e. second-in-command)
 DeForest Kelley as Lieutenant Commander Dr. Leonard "Bones" McCoy: The ship's chief medical officer
 James Doohan as Lieutenant Commander Montgomery "Scotty" Scott: The Enterprises chief engineer and second officer (i.e. third-in-command)
 Nichelle Nichols as Lieutenant Nyota Uhura: The ship's communications officer
 George Takei as Lieutenant Hikaru Sulu: The ship's helmsman
 Majel Barrett as Nurse Christine Chapel: The ship's head nurse (Barrett, who played the ship's first officer, Number One, in "The Cage," also voiced the ship's computer.)
 Grace Lee Whitney as Janice Rand: The captain's yeoman

Episodes

The table below lists episodes by order of their original NBC air date, which sometimes differed from the order of filming and production.

Home media
In early 1980, Paramount Home Video issued a limited series of VHS tapes with two episodes per volume, pursuant to the theatrical release of Star Trek: The Motion Picture, with a selling price of $79.99 per volume.

Beginning in March 1981, a handful of season-one episodes debuted on CED. With the release of Star Trek II: The Wrath of Khan in theatres in June 1982, Paramount Home Video took a gamble on releasing the season-one episode "Space Seed" (along with a handful of theatrical titles) on public sale for a reduced price of $29.99, at a time when videotape titles typically sold for around $80. The move put the episode into the top sales position for the remainder of the year (helping to establish the “sell-thru” retail market), and into 1983, when Star Trek II went on public sale for $39.95. A complete set of season-one episodes debuted from 1985 through 1989 on laserdisc, VHS, and Betamax formats, typically with two episodes per volume (“The Menagerie”, Parts 1 and 2 appeared the year prior on laserdisc). Columbia House began issuing mail-order volumes featuring episodes in "star date" order in 1986.

The original series pilot, "The Cage", was released to home video in 1986, consisting of black-and-white workprint footage combined with color footage from the season-one, two-part episode "The Menagerie" with a run time of 73 minutes. In 1988, the excised color footage was found and the full-color version of the episode debuted on television and was later given a home-video release for the first time, with a shorter run time of 64 minutes.

Beginning in August 1999, season-one episodes debuted on DVD, with two episodes per volume, completing the entire series, including both versions of "The Cage", in November 1991. A complete-season box set with new bonus features, but without either version of the pilot, was released in August 2004.

Season one was released on the HD-DVD format as a 10-disc set in late 2007. The set included the series with remastered effects on hybrid DVD/HD-DVD combo discs, which play in DVD players at standard definition, but also on appropriate HD-DVD players. HD-DVD was overall discontinued, so only season one was released on HD-DVD, although the later two seasons were still released as remastered DVD versions. By purchasing a HD-DVD player and a remastered HD-DVD Star Trek season one, buyers of this special promotion could acquire a remote control shaped like Star Trek original-series phaser prop. Toshiba had partnered with Paramount to release the original series in remastered format, to support its then-new HD-DVD optical video disc format.

The  Star Trek: Beyond the Final Frontier documentary was included with the season-one HD DVD box set of Star Trek: The Original Series. However, the documentary was included in the DVD component of the set, not the HD portion.

The first season, with remastered effects, debuted on Blu-ray on April 28, 2009.  On September 6, 2016, it was re-released as part of the Star Trek 50th Anniversary set, which included the three seasons of the original series, original-cast films up to Star Trek VI, and the 1970s animated series on Blu-Ray optical discs.

Reception
In 2019, CBR rated season one of Star Trek (1966–1969 series) as the 10th-best season of all Star Trek seasons up to that time, comparing it to seasons of later series.

See also
 List of Star Trek: The Original Series episodes – all episodes listed in chronological order, no summaries
 Star Trek: The Original Series (season 2) – listing of second-season episodes, summarized with links
 Star Trek: The Original Series (season 3) – listing of third-season episodes, summarized with links

References

1966 American television seasons
Original Series
1967 American television seasons
Star Trek: The Original Series